A sortable list of mountains above 4,000 metres in the South American Andes.

Considerations

The list is an incomplete list of mountains in the Andes. There are many named and unnamed peaks in the Andes that are currently not included in this list. The dividing line between a mountain with multiple peaks and separate mountains is not always clear (see Highest unclimbed mountain). The table below lists the summits with at least 400m prominence.

List

There are one hundred 6000m peaks in the Andes and nearly 900 peaks over 5000m.

External links

The lists can be contradictory but are all useful. They use different criteria of prominence or re-ascent for defining major peaks and sub-peaks.
 "The 6000m peaks of the Andes" - a comprehensive, up-to-date and well researched list.
  at Peak Bagger.com – a hypertext list

Andes
Andes